Blendi Xhemajl Baftiu (born 17 February 1998) is a Kosovan professional footballer who plays as an attacking midfielder for Albanian club FC Drita and the Kosovo national team.

Club career

Early career
Baftiu began his football career with the youth team of Ramiz Sadiku until 25 September 2015, where he signed a long term contract with Albanian Superliga club Skënderbeu Korçë, but he during the 2015–16 season would play with under-19 team.

Prishtina
On 1 June 2016, Baftiu joined Football Superleague of Kosovo side Prishtina, on a three-year contract.

Loan at Flamurtari
On 10 August 2017, Baftiu joined Football Superleague of Kosovo side Flamurtari, on a season-long loan.

Ballkani
On 14 June 2018, Baftiu joined Football Superleague of Kosovo side Ballkani, on a two-year contract. On 19 August 2018, he made his debut in a 0–1 away win against Liria after being named in the starting line-up.

International career

Under-21
On 21 March 2017, Baftiu received a call-up from Kosovo U21 for a 2019 UEFA European Under-21 Championship qualification match against Republic of Ireland U21. On 6 June 2019, he made his debut with Kosovo U21 in a match against Andorra U21 after coming on as a substitute at 86th minute in place of Arbnor Muja.

Senior
On 24 December 2019, Baftiu received a call-up from Kosovo for the friendly match against Sweden and made his debut after coming on as a substitute at 46th minute in place of Ylldren Ibrahimaj.

References

External links

Living people
1998 births
Sportspeople from Pristina
Kosovo Albanians
Kosovan footballers
Kosovo international footballers
Kosovo youth international footballers
Kosovo under-21 international footballers
Association football midfielders
Football Superleague of Kosovo players
FC Prishtina players
KF Flamurtari players
KF Ballkani players
Kategoria Superiore players
KF Skënderbeu Korçë players